Karwand Dam, is an earthfill dam on Arunawati river near Shirpur, Dhule district in state of Maharashtra in India.

Specifications

Purpose
 Irrigation

See also
 Dams in Maharashtra
 List of reservoirs and dams in India

References

Dams in Dhule district
Dams completed in 1970
1970 establishments in Maharashtra